Dias Angga Putra (born 6 May 1989) is an Indonesian professional footballer who plays as a right-back for Liga 1 club Dewa United.

Personal life 
In November 2014, Dias got married. His mother is from Ternate, Maluku.

Club career
He signed a two-year contract with Pelita Bandung Raya on 26 November 2013. In November 2014, he signed again with Persib Bandung.

Honours

Club
Persib Bandung U-21
Indonesia Super League U-21: 2009–10
Persib Bandung
 Indonesia President's Cup: 2015
Bali United
 Liga 1: 2019, 2021–22

References

External links
 

Indonesian footballers
Living people
1989 births
Sundanese people
People from Bandung
Sportspeople from West Java
Persib Bandung players
Persisam Putra Samarinda players
Bali United F.C. players
Dewa United F.C. players
Pelita Bandung Raya players
Liga 1 (Indonesia) players
Association football defenders
Indonesia youth international footballers